Sergei Lobanov (born 19 May 2001) is a Russian chess player who holds the title of grandmaster.

Biography
Sergei Lobanov was student of Saint Petersburg chess school. He played for Russia in European Youth Chess Championships and World Youth Chess Championships in the different age groups and best result reached in 2015 in Poreč, when he won European Youth Chess Championship in the U14 age group. In 2013, Sergei Lobanov won bronze medal in World Youth Chess Championship in the U12 age group. 
He two times played for Russia team in World Youth U16 Chess Olympiads where he won gold (2017) and silver (2016) medal in team competition, as well as silver (2017) and bronze (2016) medals in individual competition. 
In 2016, Sergei Lobanov won the bronze medal in the Saint Petersburg Chess Championship. In 2017, he won Saint Petersburg International Chess tournament with Grandmaster norm.

In 2017, he was awarded the FIDE International Master (IM) title, and in 2022 he became a grandmaster (GM).

References

External links

Sergei Lobanov chess games at 365chess.com

2001 births
Living people
Russian chess players
Chess grandmasters